Thalawathugoda  is a suburb of Colombo. The Diyawanna Oya (Parliament Lake) forms the "Sri Jayawardenapura-Kotte" boundary of Thalawathugoda. The suburb is a rapidly developing residential area with many facilities. New modern luxury housing schemes are being developed around Kalalgoda Road and Hokandara Road to cater to high end housing demand. A notable expatriate and upper middle class local population resides in Thalawathugoda.

Hospitals
 Sri Jayawardenepura Hospital
 Hemas Hospital
 Sri Nara Ayrvedic medical center

Schools
 Agramathya College
 i-GATE College
 Vidura College

Banks
 Nations Trust Bank
 Sampath Bank
 Commercial Bank
 Bank Of Ceylon
 Hatton National Bank
 People's Bank
 National Savings Bank
 Pan Asia Bank
 Citizens Development Bank

Urban Council
Thalawathugoda is served by the Maharagama Urban Council. A separate urban council for Thalwathugoda does not exist at present.

Postal structure
Earlier, Thalawathugoda had a sub post office which was controlled by the Battaramulla main post office. The promoted Thalawathugoda Post Office was opened recently. However, a few areas fall under the Hokandara and Pannipitiya postal limits.

See also
 Diyasaru Park

External links
Detailed map of Thalawathugoda & Battaramulla vicinity and Sri Lanka

Populated places in Western Province, Sri Lanka